Events of 2019 in Ghana.

Incumbents 
President: Nana Akufo-Addo 
Vice President: Mahamudu Bawumia 
 Chief Justice: Sophia Akuffo (until December 20)

Events

Births

Deaths 

 
2010s in Ghana
Years of the 21st century in Ghana
Ghana
Ghana